Señorita Colombia 2018 was the 66th edition of the Miss Colombia pageant. It was held at the Cartagena de Indias Convention Center in Cartagena on November 12, 2018.

At the end of the event, Laura Gonzàlez of Cartagena crowned Gabriela Tafur of Valle as Señorita Colombia 2018-2019. She represented Colombia in Miss Universe 2019 and ended up in the Top 5. Señorita Colombia 2018, Valeria Morales of Valle, was in charge of crowning the finalists at the pageant.

Results

Final results 
  The contestant was a Finalist/Runner-up in an International pageant.

  The contestant was a Semi-Finalist in an International pageant.

Pageant

Format 
The results of the preliminary competition, which consisted of the swimsuit competition, the evening gown competition, and the closed-door interview, will determine the 10 semi-finalists who will advance to the first cut. The top 10 finalists compete in swimsuit and evening gown, while the top 5 will compete in the question and answer round and a final catwalk. Afterward, the winner will be decided by the panel of judges.

Judges 
 Jessica Newton – former Miss Peru, and the director of the Miss Peru Organization.
 Luca Burei – Italian economist, and CEO of L’Oreal.
 Henry Faarup – Panamanian civil engineer, obtained diplomatic and administrative positions in his country and Europe.
 Sirapop Deshraska – Thai fashion designer.

Contestants 
26 contestants competed for the title.

Notes

References

External links
 Official website

2018 in Colombia
Miss Colombia
Colombia